Gilbert Finn  (September 3, 1920 – January 7, 2015) was a Canadian businessman and was the 26th Lieutenant Governor of New Brunswick from 1987 to 1994.

Born in Inkerman, New Brunswick, he received a Bachelor of Arts degree from Laval University in 1944. In 1974 he was made a Member of the Order of Canada and was promoted to Officer in 1979. In 2008 he returned his insignia of the Order in protest of the appointment of Henry Morgentaler, but never formally resigned his appointment to the Order.

Arms

See also 
Université Laval

References

1920 births
2015 deaths
Lieutenant Governors of New Brunswick
Officers of the Order of Canada
Université Laval alumni